The Journal of Pakistan Medical Association is a monthly peer-reviewed medical journal published by the Pakistan Medical Association. It publishes editorials, original articles, case reports, and letters concerning medicine and health practices. The editor-in-chief is Fatema Jawad.

Abstracting and indexing 
The journal is abstracted and indexed in Index Medicus/MEDLINE/PubMed, BIOSIS Previews, and the Science Citation Index Expanded. According to the Journal Citation Reports, the journal has a 2012 impact factor of 0.409.

References

External links 
 

English-language journals
General medical journals
Healthcare in Pakistan
Monthly journals
Academic journals published by learned and professional societies
Publications established in 1951